Wayne Keon Turner (born March 22, 1976) is a retired American professional basketball player. He played high school basketball at Beaver Country Day School in Brookline, Massachusetts. As a star point guard for the Kentucky Wildcats during a four-year period in which they won two national titles (1996 and 1998) and lost in the championship game once (1997). He set the NCAA record for games played (which has since been broken) with 151 games in his four-year Kentucky Wildcats career.

During his college career he appeared twice on the cover of Sports Illustrated magazine. Following his college years he played for the NBA's Boston Celtics and the International Basketball League's Cincinnati Stuff. In 2000, he signed with the Harlem Globetrotters. In 2002, he played for the Dakota Wizards of the Continental Basketball Association and helped the team win the 2002 CBA Championship. Turner rejoined the Wizards in 2005, helping them reach the play-offs. In 2008, he returned to the CBA as a member of the East Kentucky Miners.

Turner also played as an import (non-local) in the Italian team Andrea Costa Imola (September to December 2001), and in the Australasian National Basketball League for the Townsville Crocodiles (2002–03), before his contract was terminated following charges laid in the U.S. after police found an illegally possessed 9mm handgun, loaded with 12 rounds, in his rental car. Turner said the case was eventually dismissed in 2005. He also signed a one-year deal (2007–08) with the NBL's New Zealand Breakers.

In September 2010, he returned to the University of Kentucky to finish his undergraduate degree, and joined the men's basketball staff at his alma mater.
Turner was also the Director of Player Development for the men's basketball team at the University of Louisville, working under his former coach Rick Pitino and briefly under David Padgett.

In literature
Wayne Turner is mentioned in Frank X Walker's poem "Death by Basketball," found in his volume of poetry, Affrilachia.

See also
 List of NCAA Division I men's basketball players with 145 games played

References

External links
 Kentucky Wildcats player biography
 NBA stats @ www.BasketballReference.com
 Wayne Turner page

1976 births
Living people
American expatriate basketball people in Australia
American expatriate basketball people in Belgium
American expatriate basketball people in Italy
American expatriate basketball people in New Zealand
American men's basketball players
Andrea Costa Imola players
Basketball players from Boston
Boston Celtics players
Cincinnati Stuff players
Dakota Wizards (CBA) players
Harlem Globetrotters players
Kentucky Wildcats men's basketball players
McDonald's High School All-Americans
New Zealand Breakers players
Parade High School All-Americans (boys' basketball)
Point guards
Spirou Charleroi players
Townsville Crocodiles players
Undrafted National Basketball Association players
Beaver Country Day School alumni